= Noblet Ruddock =

18th century Bristol slave trader

Noblett Ruddock (fl. 1712–1725) was a Bristol slave trader during the 18th century.

== Early life ==
Ruddock was of Irish heritage and a freeholder of Ireland, a member of the Council House, and also a sheriff of the Bristol city council. Ruddock in his later years also became the vicar of Stockland.

== Career ==
According to Nini Rodgers' book Ireland, Slavery, and Anti-Slavery: 1612–1865, Ruddock was Bristol's second largest slave trader. Ruddock was not only a trader in slaves, but like a lot of other traders at the time, he traded in tobacco as well. Ruddock paid for roughly 37 slave voyages varying from 1713 to 1731 according to numerous sources. After taking slaves from various different locations in Africa, like Bight of Biafra, Gulf of Guinea islands, West Central Africa and St. Helena. Ruddock went to a handful of different countries across the Atlantic to trade in slaves. Ruddock went to Jamaica thirteen times, Barbados eight times, Virginia six times, South Carolina four times, and St. Kitts three times to drop off his slaves. According to slavevoyages.org, Ruddock's ships carried 8923 slaves all together but only 7229 slaves survived. 19% of the slaves died which was higher than the 12% average of slave deaths during the Trans-Atlantic slave trade.

Nearing the end of the slave trade, Ruddock's earnings from the slave trade slowly dwindled. Eventually, Ruddock fell into bankruptcy and he fled to the West Indies. Shortly after his bankruptcy, the Council House removed him from the council because of a seven-year absence.

Ruddock's brother-in-law Philip Harris (fl. 1715–1726) was also a prominent slave trader in Bristol, and together they owned the ship Triton in 1719.

== More reading ==
- Richardson David Bristol Africa 18th Century Slave Trade Volume 1
- Richardson David Bristol Africa 18th Century Slave Trade Volume 2
- ref=41086
- Streeten, F.E., The Law Journal, Spottswoode and Co., 1892, 443.
- Rodgers, N., Ireland, Slavery and Anti-Slavery: 1612–1865, Springer, 2007, 56.
- Eltis, D., Slavery in the Development of the Americas, Cambridge University Press, 2004, 102.
- Latimer, J., The Annals of Bristol in the Eighteenth Century, The Selwood Printing Works, 1893, 237.
